Bodrogkeresztúr (shortly, "Keresztúr") is a village in Borsod-Abaúj-Zemplén county, Hungary.

Before World War II, there was a sizable Jewish community in Bodrogkeresztúr. At its height, there were 535 Jews in the community, but most of them were murdered by the Nazis during the Holocaust in Hungary.

Rabbi Yeshaya Steiner of the Kerestir Hasidic dynasty lived here at 67 Kossuth Utca. The house still serves thousands of people annually.

References

External links 
 Street map 
 Bodrogkeresztúr, Hungary - JewishGen KehilaLinks
 Bodrogkeresztúr - Footsteps of the wonder rabbis 

Populated places in Borsod-Abaúj-Zemplén County
Jewish communities in Hungary
Shtetls
Jewish communities destroyed in the Holocaust